Frank Edward Wade (October 6, 1873 – March 3, 1930) was an American football player and coach, lawyer, and piano manufacturer.  He served as the head football coach at DePauw University in 1895 and at Syracuse University from 1897 to 1899, compiling a career college football record of 20–12–3.  Wade was born in Malta Bend, Missouri on October 6, 1873.  He attended Washington University in St. Louis before graduating from Yale University in 1896 and Syracuse University College of Law in 1898.  He practiced law in Syracuse, New York, and was president of the Amphion Piano Company, which he sold a few years before his death in 1930.

Head coaching record

References

External links
 

1873 births
1930 deaths
DePauw Tigers football coaches
Syracuse Orange football coaches
American military personnel of the Spanish–American War
New York (state) lawyers
Syracuse University College of Law alumni
Washington University in St. Louis alumni
Yale University alumni
People from Saline County, Missouri